Bridge Street subway station serves Laurieston and Gorbals in Glasgow, Scotland. It is the main interchange between the Glasgow Subway and buses travelling to and from the south side.  It is the nearest subway station for the Citizens Theatre, O2 Academy Glasgow, Glasgow Sheriff Court and Glasgow Central Mosque.

It was opened in 1896 and comprehensively modernised in 1977–1980. The station retains its original island platform configuration.

Past passenger numbers
 2004/05: 0.470 million
 2011/12: 0.397 million annually

References

Glasgow Subway stations
Railway stations in Great Britain opened in 1896
Gorbals